Four by four or 4x4 refers primarily to a four-wheel drive, a vehicle with a drivetrain that allows all four wheels to receive torque simultaneously from an engine.

It may also refer to:

Film, TV and games
 4x4 (1965 film), a 1965 Nordic film
 4x4 (2019 film), a 2019 Argentine film
 "4 x 4" (CSI), a 2005 episode of CSI: Crime Scene Investigation
 4x4 (telenovela), a 2008 Argentine telenovela
 Rubik's Revenge, the 4x4x4 version of the Rubik's Cube

Music
4x4 (band), a Ghanaian band
 4x4 garage, an electronic dance music genre
 4x4 (Carla Bley album), 2000
 4x4 (Casiopea album), 1982
 4×4 (Granger Smith EP), 2015
 "4x4" (song), by Miley Cyrus
 "4x4", a 2001 song by Boiler Room
 Four by Four, an album by Backyard Babies

Other uses
 4x4, the codename for the AMD Quad FX platform
 Four-by-four or 4x4, a size of lumber